The Mayor of Tbilisi is an elected politician in Tbilisi. Before 2005 the mayors used to be appointed by the central government. In 2006 first mayoral elections were held in the history of the Republic of Georgia. The first elected mayor of Tbilisi is Giorgi (Gigi) Ugulava who was re-elected in 2006 after one year of being on the position of an appointed Mayor of Tbilisi.

The role 
The Mayor is responsible for budgeting and strategic planning of some governmental functions across whole Tbilisi.  The plans of the mayor are scrutinised by the 
Tbilisi Assembly (Sakrebulo) and actioned by the different governmental bodies of the Tbilisi City Hall.

List of mayors (1991–) 
 Tamaz Vashadze: 2 October 1991 – 6 January 1992
 Otar Litanishvili: 6 January 1992 – 21 January 1993
 Konstantine Gabashvili: 21 January 1993 – 16 October 1993
 Nikoloz Lekishvili: 16 October 1993 – 8 December 1995
 Badri Shoshitaishvili: 8 December 1995 – 8 August 1998
 Ivane (Vano) Zodelava: 10 August 1998 – 19 April 2004
 Zurab Tchiaberashvili: 19 April 2004 – 12 July 2005
 Giorgi (Gigi) Ugulava: 12 July 2005 – 12 October 2006/ 12 October 2006 – 30 May 2010/ 30 May 2010 – 22 December 2013
 Sevdia Ugrekhelidze (acting): 22 December 2013 – 2 August 2014
 David Narmania: 2 August 2014–13 November 2017
 Kakha Kaladze: 13 November 2017–present

History
Due to the sizable Armenian population of Tbilisi in 19th and 20th centuries, the office of mayor was chiefly occupied by the local Armenians, with the exception of several Georgian mayors, such as Dimitri Kipiani, Vasil Cherkezishvili and Benia Chkhikvishvili.

See also
 Timeline of Tbilisi

References 

Government of Tbilisi
Tbilisi
Mayors